Toast Boy's Kiss is a 2001 Taiwanese romantic comedy television series produced by Hsiao Yeh and directed by Doze Niu, starring Lee Wei and Lee Kang-i. The show was first broadcast on Taiwan Television, was one of the most popular Taiwanese series in 2001.

A spin-off sequel was broadcast in 2004 on Eastern Television.

Awards and nominations

References

2001 Taiwanese television series debuts
2001 Taiwanese television series endings
Taiwan Television original programming
Mandarin-language television shows
Television shows filmed in Taiwan
Television shows set in Taiwan
Taiwanese romance television series